Jane Bell (1910–1998) was a Canadian track and field athlete. 

Other notable people with the name Jane Bell include:

 Jane Bell (1873–1959), Scottish-born Australian nurse and midwife
 Jane S. Bell (1798–1873), British illustrator